The list of shipwrecks in October 1851 includes ships sunk, foundered, wrecked, grounded, or otherwise lost during October 1851.

1 October

2 October

3 October

4 October

5 October

6 October

7 October

8 October

9 October

10 October

11 October

12 October

13 October

14 October

15 October

16 October

17 October

18 October

19 October

20 October

o

21 October

22 October

23 October

24 October

25 October

26 October

27 October

28 October

29 October

30 October

31 October

Unknown date

References

1851-10